() was a one-off music competition in the Eurovision format, organised and broadcast by the Austrian broadcaster Österreichischer Rundfunk (ORF). It served as an alternative for the Eurovision Song Contest 2020, which was planned to be held in Rotterdam, Netherlands, but was cancelled due to the COVID-19 pandemic.

The competition consisted of three semi-finals between 14 and 18 April 2020 and a final on 18 April 2020, and was hosted by Andi Knoll. All shows were broadcast on the television channel ORF 1, as well as on the streaming platform ORF-TVthek.

Format 

In each semi-final, the music videos (or national final performances) of 13 or 14 entries that would have taken part in the Eurovision Song Contest 2020 were shown. Each member of the jury awarded 0–8, 10 or 12 points to each entry. The entry that received most points in each semi-final proceeded to the final on 18 April 2020. Out of the three finalists, the winner was determined by 100% televote of the Austrian public.

Presenter 
The programme was hosted by Andi Knoll, who has been the Austrian commentator for the Eurovision Song Contest since 1999.

Jury 
The jury consisted of 10 singers who represented Austria in past editions of the Eurovision Song Contest:

Hans "Waterloo" Kreuzmayr (1976, with Robinson)
Simone Stelzer (1990)
Petra Frey (1994)
Manuel Ortega (2002)
Alf Poier (2003)
Eric Papilaya (2007)
Nadine Beiler (2011)
Conchita Wurst (2014)
Zoë Straub (2016)
Cesár Sampson (2018)

Participants

Semi-final 1 
The first semi-final took place on 14 April 2020 at 20:15 CEST and featured the following competing entries:

Semi-final 2 
The second semi-final took place on 16 April 2020 at 20:15 CEST and featured the following competing entries:

Semi-final 3 
The third semi-final took place on 18 April 2020 at 20:15 CEST and featured the following competing entries:

Final 
The live final took place on 18 April 2020 at 21:45 CEST and featured the three songs (one from each semi-final) that received most points from the jury.

See also 
 Eurovision: Europe Shine a Light
 Die Grand Prix Hitliste
 Eurovision 2020 – das deutsche Finale
 Eurovision: Come Together
 Free European Song Contest
 Sveriges 12:a

Notes

References 

2020 song contests
2020 in Austrian television
Television shows about the Eurovision Song Contest
Eurovision Song Contest 2020
2020 in Austria
2020 in music
April 2020 events in Austria